Ferdinando Galli-Bibiena (18 August 1657 – 3 January 1743), surname also spelled Galli da Bibiena or Bibbiena, was an Italian Baroque-era architect, designer, and painter.

Biography 
Bibiena was born on 18 August 1657 at Bologna. He was the son of painter Giovanni Maria Galli (1625–1665), and he studied painting under Carlo Cignani and architecture under Giulio Trogli, called il Paradosso. On the recommendation of Cignani, Bibiena entered into the service of the duke of Parma and also worked for the Farnese dynasty at Piacenza over a period of 30 years. His main work during this time was the garden and villa of Colorno, but he also earned a reputation for his scenic designs and began working for the theatre.

In 1708, Bibiena was called to Barcelona to organize the decorations in connection with the wedding festivities of the future Holy Roman emperor Charles VI. Following his accession, Bibiena traveled to Vienna, where he worked on designs of scenery and decorations for court festivities and opera performances. In his decorations for the theatre and festivities, Bibiena replaced the central (vertical) axis with a diagonal axis, introducing an angular perspective.

In the competition to select a design and architect for the construction of the Karlskirche, Johann Bernhard Fischer von Erlach was chosen over Bibiena. He returned to Bologna in 1716, where in 1717, he was elected as a member of the Clementine Academy.

In 1731, Bibiena built the royal theatre of Mantua (which burned down 50 years later, in 1781). He produced several books, including:
 L'Architettura civile (1711; "Civil Architecture"), later reissued under various titles
 Varie opere di prospettiva (1703–1708; "Various Works of Perspective").

Past the age of 86, Bibiena died on 3 January 1743.

Family 
The Galli-Bibiena family derives its name from the surname and birthplace of Giovanni Maria Galli (1625–1665), who was born at Bibbiena (Italy) outside Florence. Giovanni studied painting under Francesco Albani and laid the foundations of an artistry which was continued by his descendants, who dedicated themselves to scenic work (with set design) for the theatre. For example, Ferdinando's second son, Antonio, was well regarded, like his father, as a pittore scenico or teatrale, active in the arts of arte scenografica.

Using the highly ornate style of late Baroque sculpture and architecture, the members of the Galli-Bibiena family produced a series of theatrical and other designs that are exceptional for their intricate splendour and spacious proportions achieved by detailed perspective. Among their followers was Francesco Zinani of Reggio Emilia.

From about 1690 to 1787, eight Bibienas designed and painted for many of the courts of Europe with intricate settings for operas, weddings, and funerals. The Habsburgs were their most generous patrons.

Among his followers or artists in his studio was Domenico Francia.

Notes

References 
  A. H. Mayor, The Bibiena Family, 1940.

External links

Architectural and ornament drawings : Juvarra, Vanvitelli, the Bibiena family, & other Italian draughtsmen, an exhibition catalog from The Metropolitan Museum of Art (fully available online as PDF), which contains material on Galli-Bibiena (see index)

1656 births
1743 deaths
18th-century Italian architects
17th-century Italian painters
Italian male painters
18th-century Italian painters
Italian scenic designers
Artists from Bologna
Architects from Bologna
18th-century Italian male artists